The Rink, formerly Revolution Arena , is a 1,000 seat multi-purpose arena in Battle Creek, Michigan. It features an 85' x 200' sheet of ice for hockey, figure skating, and open skating.

The arena is home to the Battle Creek Bruins and several adult league team. The Rink was the home of a junior hockey team, the Battle Creek Jr. Revolution of the North American 3 Hockey League and two professional ice hockey teams, the Battle Creek Revolution of the All American Hockey League and the Battle Creek Rumble Bees of the Federal Prospects Hockey League.

External links
Rink website

All American Hockey League (2008–2011) arenas
Indoor arenas in Michigan
Indoor ice hockey venues in the United States
Sports venues in Michigan